Joonas Järveläinen (17 August 1990) is an Estonian professional basketball player for BC Tallinna Kalev of the Latvian–Estonian Basketball League. He is a 2.02 m (6 ft 8 in) tall power forward.

Professional career
Järveläinen won the Estonian Basketball Cup in 2010 with University of Tartu. From 2013 to 2015, he played for TTÜ. In 2015, he joined Pärnu.

In August 2020, Järveläinen signed with Grindavík of the Icelandic top-tier Úrvalsdeild karla.

Estonian national team
Järveläinen is a member of the Estonia national basketball team since 2015.

Awards and accomplishments

Professional career
 1x Estonian Basketball Cup: (2010)

References and notes

External links
 Joonas Järveläinen at basket.ee 
 Joonas Järveläinen at bbl.net

1990 births
Living people
BC Valga players
British Basketball League players
Expatriate basketball people in England
Estonian men's basketball players
Grindavík men's basketball players
KK Pärnu players
Korvpalli Meistriliiga players
Plymouth Raiders players
Rapla KK players
Small forwards
Sportspeople from Paide
University of Tartu basketball team players
TTÜ KK players
Úrvalsdeild karla (basketball) players
University of Tartu alumni
Tallinn University of Technology alumni
Estonian expatriate basketball people in Iceland
Estonian expatriate sportspeople in England